Saint Gilbert may refer to:

Gilbert of Sempringham, founder of the Gilbertine Order
Gilbert de Moravia (died 1245), later known as Saint Gilbert of Dornoch, Bishop of Caithness and founder of Dornoch Cathedral
Gilbert of Meaux, Bishop of Meaux
Gilbert of Limerick, first Bishop of Limerick